Lycan may refer to:
 Lycan, Colorado
 An abbreviation for lycanthrope (werewolf) popularized by the Underworld film series

People with the surname
 William Lycan (born 1945), American philosopher

See also
 Lykan HyperSport, a Lebanese car
 Lycanthrope (disambiguation)
 Lycaon (disambiguation)
Lichen (disambiguation)